Alexander Pogorelov is a retired Soviet/Russian gymnast. He competed at the 1983 World Championships in Budapest and won a silver medal in horizontal bars, which he shared with Philippe Vatuone in a tie, and a silver medal from the team competition.

References

Living people
Soviet male artistic gymnasts
Medalists at the World Artistic Gymnastics Championships
Year of birth missing (living people)